Carigara, officially the Municipality of Carigara, is a 2nd class municipality in the province of Leyte, Philippines. According to the 2020 census, it has a population of 54,656 people.

The town, founded in 1571, is the first town established in the entire region of Eastern Visayas. In 1735, Leyte and Samar were separated from Cebu and placed under a single provincial government with Carigara as the first provincial capital.

Carigara is known for its pastillas, humba, sundang (machete), and the hubhob, a local delicacy made from grated cassava, egg, kalamay, milk, and sugar cooked inside a bagacay (bamboo pole) over charcoals.

History

Carigara was originally called "Kan Gara", meaning "that of Gara" or simply "Gara's." Gara was said to have come from Borneo, one of the unnamed companions of the ten datus who landed in Panay and purchased that island from the Ati (or Aeta) chief Marikudo. Later, for phonetic convenience, "Kan Gara" became Kalgara and when the Spaniards came, they called the place Carigara; hence its present name.

Carigara is the first town established in Eastern Visayas. Its town fiesta which is celebrated every 16 July, commemorates the day of the first coming of the Spaniards dated July 16, 1569. The fiesta that is celebrated almost the entire month of July was dubbed as the Fiesta of the Holy Cross.

In the first quarter of 2018, Puregold was able to penetrate the town market and became operational to serve Carigaran-ons and the neighboring towns. The first mall opened as well, then followed by Goldilocks in the second quarter of 2019.

Carigara's Attempt for a World Record

Last July 14, 2018, Carigara attempted to clinch Guinness World Records for the "Largest Participants in Philippine Folk Dance" by performing Kuratsa or Curacha. The event was part of the town's 423rd fiesta celebration on July 16, it made the locals proud and hopeful that the said event will help to boost their town's economic and tourism activities. With nearly 5,000 participants mostly students and teachers from different schools, municipal workers, the private sector, and local residents have joined. Carigara had already submitted their bid, waiting for the official confirmation.

Geography

Topography
It is a town in the northern part of Leyte province located right on the shores of Carigara Bay, and surrounded by wide rice fields fanning out towards the mountains in the distance.

Carigara shares borders with Capoocan to the west, Ormoc to the south, Jaro to the southeast, Tunga to the east and Barugo to the northeast.

Flora and Fauna

Flora
The climate and topographical features of the vast land, wide rice fields and hilly areas of Carigara make it ideal for the growing of fruit-bearing trees, vegetables and various crops. Among the fruit-bearing trees most fitting to be planted are bananas, coconuts, jackfruits, mangoes, guavas, rambutans, santol, and star apples. For vegetables, gabi, karubasa, pipino, kamalunggay, marigoso, munggos, sitaw, and upo are the most commonly produced by some farmers and local residents in which thrive best in the community. For crops, kamote and balanghoy are the root crops that mainly thrive and rice crops, plus more.

Fauna
Carigara possesses vast forests especially near the highlands, its fauna is a mixture of domestic and non-domestic animals. Some of those domesticated are carabaos, horses, cats, dogs, chickens, and pigs. Non-domesticated or wild animals should include snakes, frogs, insects, various kinds of lizards, birds and many more.

Barangays
Carigara is politically subdivided into 49 barangays, namely:

Climate

Demographics

Language

The Waray-waray language is predominantly spoken within the municipality. Other recognized minority languages are Cebuano and Tagalog.

English is the language used in official purposes and often mixed in with Waray in casual conversations.
Spanish is also present and/or used in very few purposes, but never in speech and communication.

Faith and Religion
Carigara is a Christian municipality, and most of the population are Roman Catholics. There are also adherents of other Christian denominations and sects like the Iglesia ni Cristo, the Church of Jesus Christ of Latter-day Saints, Seventh-day Adventists (Sabadistas), Evangelicals or Born Again Christians, Baptists, Jehovah's Witnesses (Mga Saksi ni Jehova) and some more.

Economy

Culture

Festival

On January 25, 2019, Carigara had officially celebrated its first festival along with their 448th founding anniversary called the Magara Festival. Magara locally means abundant, elegant, and vibrant. The first Magara Festival focuses mainly on the celebration of the abundance of the town's agriculture, local products, history, and its people.

Events

Turugpo is a major public fight event between two male carabaos or two male horses held every Black Saturday. It is a popular event in the town attracting thousands of local and foreign tourists just to witness the famous fight.

Tourism
Here's a list of some tourist attractions of the municipality of Carigara.

Attractions include:
Lauron's Boulevard (Brgy. Baybay & Ponong) This is the place where people can buy street foods like isaw, pork barbecues, and many more.
Carigara Municipal Library and Museum (Brgy. Baybay)
Cassidy Elementary School (Brgy. Ponong) A school famous for its classical-style building.
Datu Gara Shrine (Brgy. Canal)
Gawas an Harigue (Brgy. Baybay) An old house with exposed posts on the sides.
Heroes Shrine (Brgy. Baybay & Ponong) Located right between Carigara Boulevard and the Kan Gara Gymnasium.
Holy Cross Parish Church (Brgy. Ponong) The oldest and largest church in Carigara.
Kan Gara Gymnasium (Brgy. Ponong) The largest gymnasium.
Lumen Ancestral House (Brgy. Sawang) The only house in the town which serves as a shelter for balinsasayaos.
Plaza Triunfo (Brgy. Ponong) The largest plaza. 
St. Francis Assisi Parish (Brgy. Jugaban)

Infrastructures

Transportation

Land Transport

 Pedicabs are the common mode of transportation within the town proper and the poblacións.
 Tricycles and habal-habals on the other hand are commonly used for travelling within the town, especially to the far-flung barangays.
 Vans, jeepneys and buses are the mode of transport when travelling to the cities of Tacloban and Ormoc or to the municipalities that are faraway from the town. There are few bus companies situated in Carigara.

There are new modernized PUVs that travel from Carigara to Tacloban and vice versa issued by its local government on 24 November 2021.

Sea Transport

The municipality owns a port that is located in Barangay Baybay where local boats and ships docks.

Healthcare Service

Carigara District Hospital, also abbreviated as CDH is the only public hospital in the town. Other residents of nearby towns also come here to bring their ill patients for admission and further medical service attention.

Utilities

Education
There are a total of 30 elementary schools, 6 high schools (1 Private, 4 Public, 1 pending construction) and 2 college institutions located on Carigara.

Grade School/Elementary School

Secondary School/High School
Carigara National High School
Carigara National Vocational School (formerly Carigara School of Fisheries)
Jugaban National High School
Sogod National High School
Holy Cross College of Carigara (Private)
 Parag-um National High School (soon)

College/University
Holy Cross College of Carigara
Eastern Visayas State University (Carigara Campus)

Notable personalities

Eduardo Makabenta Sr. - Waray-language poet and translator
Mike Hanopol - musician, singer-songwriter

Gallery

References

External links

 [ Philippine Standard Geographic Code]
Philippine Census Information
Local Governance Performance Management System

Municipalities of Leyte (province)